Wonder Wonder is the third album by Edith Frost, released in 2001 through Drag City.

Critical reception
No Depression wrote that "Frost’s unpolished but beautifully tuneful voice elegantly shifts through the stylistic changes, which in turn are effortlessly navigated by Chicago-area players including Rick Rizzo and Archer Prewitt." Exclaim! wrote: "Chicagoan Edith Frost's third album continues the path of heart-wrenching, introspective and beautiful songwriting, backed with simple, spare arrangements and her haunting, hint-of-twang voice." The Washington Post thought that "Frost's old-timey songs can sound like genre exercises, but the best of these tunes -- whether the lively 'Cars and Parties' or the unhurried 'You're Decided' -- are specific and personal."

Track listing

Personnel 
Musicians
Amy Domingues – cello
Steve Dorocke –  steel guitar
Edith Frost – vocals, guitar
Mark Greenberg – organ
Ryan Hembrey – bass guitar
Glenn Kotche – drums
Bill Lowman – bass guitar
Paul Mertens – flute
Rian Murphy – drums, production
Archer Prewitt – guitar, drums
Rick Rizzo – guitar
Susan Voelz – violin
Production and additional personnel
Steve Albini – engineering
John Golden – mastering
Deborah Moore – photography

References

External links 
 

2001 albums
Drag City (record label) albums
Edith Frost albums